Peter William Holmberg (born October 4, 1960) is a sailor from the U.S. Virgin Islands, who won a silver medal in Men's Finn class in the 1988 Summer Olympics, making him the only Virgin Islander medalist so far. He was born on Saint Thomas.

References

External links
 
 
 
 

1960 births
Living people
United States Virgin Islands male sailors (sport)
Sailors at the 1984 Summer Olympics – Finn
Sailors at the 1988 Summer Olympics – Finn
Olympic sailors of the United States Virgin Islands
Olympic silver medalists for the United States Virgin Islands
Oracle Racing sailors
Olympic medalists in sailing
Alinghi sailors
People from Saint Thomas, U.S. Virgin Islands
American sportsmen
Medalists at the 1988 Summer Olympics
2003 America's Cup sailors
2000 America's Cup sailors
Luna Rossa Challenge sailors